Candida, Woman of the Year is a 1943 Argentine comedy film directed by Enrique Santos Discépolo and starring Niní Marshall, Augusto Codecá, and Carlos Morganti.

Cast
 Niní Marshall ...  Cándida
 Augusto Codecá
 Carlos Morganti
 Julio Renato
 Alfredo Jordan
 Edna Norrell
 Blanca Vidal
 Lalo Malcolm
 Carlos Bellucci

References

External links
 

1943 films
1940s Spanish-language films
Argentine black-and-white films
1943 comedy films
Argentine comedy films
Films directed by Enrique Santos Discépolo
1940s Argentine films